Hebeloma arenosum is a species of mushroom in the family Hymenogastraceae. Described as new to science in 1986, it was first recorded in Wisconsin, where it was growing on sandy soil in a nursery bed containing Norway pine (Pinus resinosa). 

It is found all over the Great Lakes region of the United States, where it is an ectomycorrhizal associate with  spruce and pine grown in nursery beds. The fungus was described as new to science in 1986.

See also
List of Hebeloma species

References

arenosum
Fungi described in 1986
Fungi of North America